The Oh Hellos are an American indie folk rock duo formed in 2011 in San Marcos, Texas, consisting of siblings Tyler and Maggie Heath. They remain an independent band, with eight releases: The Oh Hellos, Through the Deep, Dark Valley, Dear Wormwood, Notos, Eurus, Boreas, and Zephyrus, as well as a Christmas EP, The Oh Hellos' Family Christmas Album. The duo initially found success on the music promotion website Bandcamp, and its music was later featured on NBC's Parenthood. When playing live, Maggie and Tyler are often joined by a large ensemble of musicians as their backing band.

History
Tyler Heath began writing and recording music in 2007, having released three albums by himself: Let It Go, A Christmas Album, and We're All In This Together. In 2011, he was joined by his sister, Maggie Heath, to write a song together for their mother's birthday. Their success led the two to form The Oh Hellos, releasing their self-titled EP later that year. On October 30, 2012, they released their self-produced debut album, Through The Deep, Dark Valley. On December 10, 2013, they released The Oh Hellos' Family Christmas Album, an EP that featured a medley of classical Christmas hymns.

On October 16, 2015, The Oh Hellos released Dear Wormwood, their second album. Dear Wormwood was inspired by The Screwtape Letters by C. S. Lewis and the writing of Patrick Rothfuss. The band described it as a sequel to their first LP Through the Deep, Dark Valley, with the first focusing on the speaker's past and Dear Wormwood focusing on the speaker's future.

On November 14, 2017, the band debuted a single, "Torches", from their EP Notos, which debuted December 8, 2017. Notos was the first EP in an ongoing series of four, taking their names from Greco-Roman deities of wind named Anemoi. In a similar fashion, the band released a single, "Grow" on January 18, 2018, from the next EP in the series, Eurus, which released February 9, 2018.

On September 4, 2020, the band released the third of the four EPs, Boreas. They released a new single, "Soap", on October 2, 2020.

On October 16, 2020, the band released the fourth of the four EPs, Zephyrus.

To celebrate the 10 year anniversary of The Oh Hellos EP, Tyler and Maggie recorded a new, acoustic version of "Hello My Old Heart", which was released on December 1, 2021.

Musical style and influences 
The Oh Hellos have a "Celtic-influenced style" that has also been referred to as a “majestic” brand of folk-pop. Though they write all of their music themselves, Maggie and Tyler combine their voices with a string band and choir to complete their sound. Sometimes there are as many as 13 musicians on stage when they are performing.

Maggie and Tyler have a very deep, introspective style. A defining characteristic of their music is the contrast between the soft melody and the intense lyrics, creating a sort of tension, as The Daily Times calls it. Many of their releases, such as Through the Deep, Dark Valley and Dear Wormwood, could be considered concept albums as they tend to tell a story with concepts and themes running through it.

Their music is also inspired by their Christian faith and their experiences with it throughout their lives.

Discography
 The Oh Hellos (2011)
 Through the Deep, Dark Valley (2012)
 The Oh Hellos' Family Christmas Album (2013)
Dear Wormwood (2015)
 Notos (2017)
 Eurus (2018)
 Boreas (2020)
 Zephyrus (2020)
 Hello My Old Heart (Ten Year Anniversary) (2021)
 Through the Deep, Dark Valley (2022 remaster)

References

External links
 

American folk rock groups
Musical groups from San Marcos, Texas
Musical groups established in 2011
2011 establishments in Texas